Movatnet is a lake in the municipality of Levanger in Trøndelag county, Norway.  The  lake lies immediately to the east of the lake Hoklingen and just to the west of the village of Markabygd.

See also
List of lakes in Norway

References

Levanger
Lakes of Trøndelag